Michael George McKay (born 15 October 1965) is an Australian former professional basketball player. He played most of his career with the Adelaide 36ers of the National Basketball League (NBL), winning the 1986 championship with the team. McKay also played in the NBL for the West Adelaide Bearcats (with whom he started his NBL career in 1983), Brisbane Bullets, Canberra Cannons and the Wollongong Hawks. He was a frequent member of the Australia men's national basketball team during the late 1980s and early 1990s, including being part of the national team at the 1992 Summer Olympics in Barcelona.

Professional career
Mike McKay started his professional career with the West Adelaide Bearcats in 1983. Along with fellow Bearcat players Al Green, Peter Ali and veteran guard Ray Wood, the then 19-year-old joined the Adelaide 36ers in 1985 after the Bearcats pulled out of the NBL at the end of 1984. Under the coaching of his former Bearcats coach Ken Cole, McKay helped the 36ers to its first Grand Final appearance where they lost to the Brisbane Bullets. McKay played in all 28 games in 1985, averaging 12.9 points, 3.4 rebounds and 1.3 assists. McKay won the NBL's Rookie of the Year award despite already having played in the NBL for two previous seasons.

The 36ers would win their first NBL championship in 1986. After compiling a 24–2 record during the regular season, including going 13–0 at Apollo Stadium (the first NBL side to go through a regular season unbeaten at home), the 36ers would reverse the 1985 GF result with a three-game series win over the Bullets. Game 2 of the series saw Adelaide's only defeat of the season at home with the Bullets pulling off an upset 104–83 win. McKay suffered a serious knee injury during the year and was forced to miss about 10 weeks.

Early on, McKay earned the nickname "Mad Max" for sometimes not being able to control his emotions on the basketball court (he was labelled a 'hot head' by some commentators, most notably by Brisbane based television commentator Gary Fleet after his clashes with Leroy Loggins during the 1986 Grand Final series).

McKay would continue to be a star performer for the 36ers until the end of the 1995 NBL season, playing in losing semi-finals in 1987 (Perth Wildcats), 1988 (Canberra Cannons), 1989 (Perth) as well as 1991 and 1995 (Perth), as well as the losing 1994 GF Series against the North Melbourne Giants. With two years still left on his contract, McKay was released by the 36ers at the end of 1995 and he joined the Brisbane Bullets in 1996 where he would win the NBL's inaugural Best Sixth Man award in his first year away from Adelaide. He played two seasons with the Bullets before moving on to two years with the Canberra Cannons (1998–99). After the 1999–2000 NBL season with the Wollongong Hawks, McKay retired from the NBL having played 448 games and averaging 12.7 points during his career.

International career
Mike McKay first won selection for the Australian Boomers in 1989 and went on to represent his country at the 1992 Summer Olympics in Barcelona, Spain. He was also a member of the Boomers who reached the quarter-finals at both the 1990 and 1994 FIBA Basketball World Cup, finishing 7th in 1990 in Argentina and 5th in 1994 in Canada.

Media
Starting in the 2012-13 NBL season, Mike McKay is an expert commentator for the NBL's online game streaming subscription service NBL.TV at Adelaide 36ers home games at the Adelaide Arena.

Personal life
As of 2016 Mike McKay still lives in Adelaide where he is the Accounts Manager for the Workwear Group.

NBL career stats

|-
| style="text-align:left"| 1983
| style="text-align:left;"| West Adelaide Bearcats
| 20 || 0 || NA || .390 || NA || .600 || 0.6 || 0.1 || 0.1 || 0.0 || 1.9
|-
| style="text-align:left"| 1984
| style="text-align:left;"| West Adelaide Bearcats
| 18 || 0 || NA || .391 || .188 || .733 || 2.7 || 1.2 || 0.3 || 0.3 || 6.8
|-
| style="text-align:left"| 1985
| style="text-align:left;"| Adelaide 36ers
| 28 || 0 || NA || .492 || .472 || .590 || 3.4 || 1.3 || 0.9 || 0.1 || 12.9
|-
| style="text-align:left; background:#afe6ba;"| 1986†
| style="text-align:left;"| Adelaide 36ers
| 30 || 1 || NA || .465 || .447 || .750 || 2.3 || 1.2 || 0.6 || 0.4 || 13.6
|-
| style="text-align:left"| 1987
| style="text-align:left;"| Adelaide 36ers
| 26 || NA || 27.3 || .422 || .363 || .709 || 3.1 || 1.6 || 1.0 || 0.2 || 14.9
|-
| style="text-align:left"| 1988
| style="text-align:left;"| Adelaide 36ers
| 20 || NA || 16.8 || .398 || .356 || .838 || 1.9 || 1.4 || 0.8 || 0.1 || 9.4
|-
| style="text-align:left"| 1989
| style="text-align:left;"| Adelaide 36ers
| 26 || NA || 28.4 || .396 || .321 || .753 || 2.9 || 2.9 || 1.2 || 0.4 || 13.5
|-
| style="text-align:left"| 1990
| style="text-align:left;"| Adelaide 36ers
| 24 || NA || NA || .457 || .470 || .686 || 2.5 || 3.2 || 0.0 || 0.0 || 13.7
|-
| style="text-align:left"| 1991
| style="text-align:left;"| Adelaide 36ers
| 28 || NA || 31.8 || .498 || .457 || .840 || 3.0 || 3.4 || 1.3 || 0.2 || 19.6
|-
| style="text-align:left"| 1992
| style="text-align:left;"| Adelaide 36ers
| 24 || 24 || 38.1 || .390 || .373 || .800 || 4.3 || 3.0 || 1.3 || 0.1 || 18.5
|-
| style="text-align:left"| 1993
| style="text-align:left;"| Adelaide 36ers
| 28 || 28 || 41.0 || .397 || .389 || .789 || 6.0 || 3.5 || 1.3 || 0.1 || 13.8
|-
| style="text-align:left"| 1994
| style="text-align:left;"| Adelaide 36ers
| 31 || NA || 23.8 || .398 || .356 || .742 || 3.5 || 2.4 || 0.9 || 0.1 || 8.2
|-
| style="text-align:left"| 1995
| style="text-align:left;"| Adelaide 36ers
| 25 || 0 || 23.2 || .373 || .347 || .762 || 2.0 || 1.8 || 0.6 || 0.1 || 7.1
|-
| style="text-align:left"| 1996
| style="text-align:left;"| Brisbane Bullets
| 29 || NA || 36.0 || .433 || .379 || .821 || 4.1 || 2.8 || 0.9 || 0.1 || 17.6
|-
| style="text-align:left"| 1997
| style="text-align:left;"| Brisbane Bullets
| 7 || NA || 35.2 || .439 || .281 || 1.000 || 5.0 || 2.7 || 0.9 || 0.9 || 18.6
|-
| style="text-align:left"| 1998
| style="text-align:left;"| Canberra Cannons
| 30 || 30 || 38.9 || .458 || .476 || .904 || 3.7 || 2.4 || 0.9 || 0.1 || 15.0
|-
| style="text-align:left"| 1998–99
| style="text-align:left;"| Canberra Cannons
| 26 || 26 || 41.9 || .414 || .373 || .803 || 4.3 || 3.3 || 0.8 || 0.2 || 17.2
|-
| style="text-align:left"| 1999–2000
| style="text-align:left;"| Wollongong Hawks
| 28 || NA || 20.4 || .346 || .317 || .955 || 1.9 || 1.5 || 0.4 || 0.0 || 5.5
|- class="sortbottom"
| style="text-align:center;" colspan="2" | Career
| 448 || NA || NA || .428 || .389 || .788 || 3.2 || 2.2 || 0.9 || 0.2 || 12.7
|}

References

External links
Profile at Eurobasket.com

1965 births
Living people
Adelaide 36ers players
Australian men's basketball players
1990 FIBA World Championship players
Basketball players at the 1992 Summer Olympics
Brisbane Bullets players
Canberra Cannons players
Olympic basketball players of Australia
Shooting guards
Small forwards
Basketball players from Adelaide
Wollongong Hawks players
1994 FIBA World Championship players